Brayan Alexander Gil Hurtado (born 28 June 2001) is a Colombian footballer who plays as a forward for Alianza Petrolera. He has lived continuously in El Salvador since he was 4, as a result of his father's playing career, Cristian Gil.

Career statistics

Club

Notes

References

2001 births
Living people
Colombian footballers
Colombian expatriate footballers
Salvadoran footballers
Salvadoran expatriate footballers
Salvadoran people of Colombian descent
Association football forwards
C.D. FAS footballers
K.A.A. Gent players
Alianza Petrolera F.C. players
Categoría Primera A players
Colombian expatriate sportspeople in Belgium
Expatriate footballers in Belgium
Naturalized citizens of El Salvador
Footballers from Cali